The 1932 European Figure Skating Championships were held in Paris, France. Elite senior-level figure skaters from European ISU member nations competed for the title of European Champion in the disciplines of men's singles, ladies' singles, and pair skating.

Results

Men

Ladies

Pairs

References

External links
 results

European Figure Skating Championships, 1932
European Figure Skating Championships, 1932
European Figure Skating Championships
International figure skating competitions hosted by France